The 2015 FIU Panthers football team represented Florida International University (FIU) in the 2015 NCAA Division I FBS football season as members of the East Division of Conference USA. They were led by third-year head coach Ron Turner and played their home games at FIU Stadium in Miami, Florida. They finished the season 5–7, 3–5 in C-USA play to finish in a three way tie for fourth place in the East Division.

Schedule
Florida International announced their 2015 football schedule on February 2, 2015. The 2015 schedule consisted of five home and seven away games in the regular season. The Panthers hosted CUSA foes Charlotte, Old Dominion, UTEP, and Western Kentucky (WKU), and traveled to Florida Atlantic, Louisiana Tech, Marshall, and Middle Tennessee.

Game summaries

at UCF

at Indiana

North Carolina Central

at Louisiana Tech

at Massachusetts

UTEP

at Middle Tennessee

Old Dominion

at Florida Atlantic

Charlotte

at Marshall

Western Kentucky

References

FIU
FIU Panthers football seasons
FIU Panthers football